Cairnie, also written Cairney, is a village in Aberdeenshire, Scotland.

It is in the district of Huntly. It has a primary school, Cairney Primary School.

References

Villages in Aberdeenshire